The abductor digiti minimi (abductor minimi digiti, abductor digiti quinti) is a muscle which lies along the lateral (outer) border of the foot, and is in relation by its medial margin with the lateral plantar artery, vein and nerves.

Its homolog in the arm is the abductor digiti minimi muscle in the hand.

Origin and insertion
It arises, by a broad origin, from the lateral process of the tuberosity of the calcaneus, from the under surface of the calcaneus between the two processes of the tuberosity, from the forepart of the medial process, from the plantar aponeurosis, and from the intermuscular septum between it and the flexor digitorum brevis.

Its tendon, after gliding over a smooth facet on the under surface of the base of the fifth metatarsal bone, is inserted, with the flexor digiti quinti brevis, into the fibular side of the base of the first phalanx of the fifth toe.

Innervation
The abductor digiti minimi is innervated by the lateral plantar nerve, a branch of the tibial nerve.

Function
Its function is flexion   and abduction of the fifth (little) toe at the metatarsophalangeal joint.

Clinical relevance
Due to its role in posture during all physical activity while in an upright position, the abductor digiti minimi is often the target of injury.

In case of polydactyly it may insert to the sixth toe instead, if there is one.

Etymology
The Latin name abductor digiti minimi translates to abductor of the small digit while the alternative name abductor digiti quinti means abductor of fifth digit.

Additional images

References
.

Foot muscles
Muscles of the lower limb
Lower limb anatomy